National Route 420 is a national highway of Japan connecting Toyota, Aichi and Shinshiro, Aichi in Japan, with a total length of 66.5 km (41.32 mi).

References

National highways in Japan
Roads in Aichi Prefecture